Several ships of the British Royal Navy have been named HMS Bruiser or HMS Bruizer.

 was an  launched in 1797 and sold in 1802.
 was an  launched in 1804. She was sold in 1815.
 was the former Robert Stephenson, an iron steam-powered ship purchased on the stocks and launched in 1854.  She was renamed Bruiser in June 1855, employed as a floating flour mill during the Crimean War and sold in 1857.
 was a  launched in 1867 and broken up at Devonport in 1886.
 was an  launched in 1895 and sold in 1914
 was a Landing Ship, Tank launched in 1942 and sold in 1946. Converted to a passenger ship in 1951 and scrapped in 1968.
She was renamed HMS Bruiser in 1947 and sold in 1954.
HMS Bruiser was intended as a Batch 2 Type 22 frigate, but was renamed as  before being laid down.

Battle honours 
Ships named Bruiser have earned the following battle honours:
Sicily, 1943
Salerno, 1944
Anzio, 1944
Atlantic, 1944
South France, 1944
Aegean, 1944

References

Bruiser